The Ministry of Labor and Social Protection of Population of the Republic of Uzbekistan, is a body of the Government of Uzbekistan that carries out the functions of public policy and legal regulation in the sphere of social protection and labor.

History

References

Government of Uzbekistan
Ministry of Labor and Social Protection of Population